Aizkraukle  District was an administrative division of Latvia, located in Vidzeme and Selonia regions, in the country's centre.

Districts were eliminated during the administrative-territorial reform in 2009.

References

Districts of Latvia